Turhan is a given name. Notable persons with that surname include:

Given name
Turhan Baytop (1920–2002), Turkish botanist
Turhan Bey (1922–2012), Turkish-American actor
Turhan Hatice Sultan (c. 1628–1683), Valide sultan of the Ottoman Empire and the final woman of the Sultanate of Women
Turhan Përmeti (c. 1840–1927), Albanian politician
Turhan Tezol (1932–2014), Turkish basketball player

Surname
Necdet Turhan (born 1957), Turkish visually impaired mountain climber and long distance runner

Fictional characters

Turhan, a character in Babylon 5

Turkish masculine given names